David Berthelot (born 22 September 1977 in France) is a French former professional footballer who played as a goalkeeper.

Career
Berthelot started his senior career with Red Star. In 2004, he signed for Raith Rovers in the Scottish Football League First Division, where he made forty appearances and scored zero goals. After that, he played for French club Villemomble Sports before retiring.

References

External links 
 Goalie honoured by the fans ... released by the club 
 La surprise Berthelot 
 

Living people
1977 births
Association football goalkeepers
French footballers
Red Star F.C. players
USL Dunkerque players
Louhans-Cuiseaux FC players
Raith Rovers F.C. players
Villemomble Sports players
French expatriate footballers
Expatriate footballers in Scotland